Corny Point is a headland located on the west coast of the Yorke Peninsula in South Australia about  north west of the town of Warooka.  The point is described as being "a sloping rocky double projection..." where the "coast on the N[orth] side is low and sandy whereas the coast on the S[outh] side is higher than the point itself."  It is the south headland of Hardwicke Bay. It was named by Matthew Flinders on 18 March 1802. The waters adjoining its shoreline are within the Southern Spencer Gulf Marine Park.  Since 1882, it has been the site of a navigation aid in the form of a lighthouse.

References

Headlands of South Australia
Yorke Peninsula
Spencer Gulf